A Bloody Night is an action 2D video game, created and published by Italian developer Emanuele Leoncilli for Microsoft Windows.

References

2017 video games
Action video games
Video games developed in Italy
Windows games
Windows-only games